Fábio Bittencourt da Costa (born 16 May 1977), best known simply as Fábio Costa, is a Brazilian former football midfielder.

Career
Fábio Costa spent a 2003 season in the Russian Premier League playing for lowly-rated FC Chernomorets Novorossiysk that had relegated after finishing last. He is currently contracted to Centro de Futebol Zico Sociedade Esportiva.

External links
 CBF

1977 births
Living people
People from Duque de Caxias, Rio de Janeiro
Brazilian footballers
Brazilian expatriate footballers
Expatriate footballers in Russia
FC Chernomorets Novorossiysk players
Russian Premier League players
Expatriate soccer players in South Africa
Mamelodi Sundowns F.C. players
Brazilian expatriate sportspeople in South Africa
Association football midfielders
Sportspeople from Rio de Janeiro (state)